Fejervarya verruculosa (common name: Sundas wart frog) is a species of frog. It is found in the Lesser Sunda Islands of Indonesia and East Timor. It is an abundant species found in paddy fields where it also breeds.

References

Fejervarya
Fauna of Timor
Amphibians of Indonesia
Taxa named by Jean Roux
Taxonomy articles created by Polbot
Amphibians described in 1911